La Boheme is a 1961 Australian TV play, a film of Giacomo Puccini's opera La bohème. It was directed by Alan Burke.

Cast
Valda Bagnall as Mimi
Rae Cocking		
Alistair Duncan		
John Faasen		
Alan Light		
Russell Smith		
Neil Warren-Smith		
John Young

Production
Alistair Duncan did not sing. His singing voice was provided by Raymond McDonald. Duncan also did this in Land of Smiles (1962).

Reception
The Sydney Morning Herald thought "the unashamed but essentially domestic and intimate sentiment" of the opera "proved exceptionally congenial to television" and thought it had "a technical excellence in presentation that might serve as a model for future televised operas. The performers were reasonably efficient in mouthing to their own prerecorded singing.. There was little outstanding singing, but plenty of competent workmanship."

References

External links
La Boheme at IMDb

Australian television plays
Australian television plays based on operas
Films directed by Alan Burke (director)